Carl F. Barger (August 18, 1930 – December 9, 1992) was a Pittsburgh attorney and baseball executive.

Biography
Barger became the President of the Pittsburgh Pirates Major League Baseball team, serving from 1987 through the beginning of 1991. He then became the first president of the Florida Marlins (now the Miami Marlins) on July 8, 1991. However, he would not live to see the new team take the field, as he suffered an aneurysm during MLB's Winter Meetings in 1992 in Louisville, Kentucky and later died. On April 5, 1993, the day that the Marlins played their first regular-season game, the team retired the number 5 in Barger's memory, as his favorite player had been Joe DiMaggio, who wore the number 5 throughout his career. The only other person to have a uniform number retired by the Marlins is Jackie Robinson, whose number 42 jersey has been retired throughout Major League Baseball to honor his achievement of breaking baseball's color barrier.

However, on February 11, 2012, the Miami Marlins unretired the number 5, as that number was requested to be worn by Logan Morrison, who a played for the Marlins from 2012 to 2014. Barger is currently honored with a plaque inside LoanDepot Park with the number 5 depicted on it.

Additionally, the Marlins designated the practice areas and fields next to Space Coast Stadium in Viera, Florida, their original Florida Spring Training facility, as the Carl F. Barger Baseball Complex.

References

External links
 Florida Marlins: History: Marlins Retired Numbers

1930 births
1992 deaths
People from Lewistown, Pennsylvania
Major League Baseball executives
Major League Baseball people with retired numbers
Major League Baseball team presidents
Pittsburgh Pirates executives
Florida Marlins executives
Shippensburg University of Pennsylvania alumni